The Old Albany Schoolhouse is a structure in Nemaha County, Kansas that was used as a school from the time of its construction circa 1866–67 to 1963. The school is one of the last remnants of the town of Albany, which declined after a railroad was built closer to the neighboring town of Sabetha. The school is a two-story rough limestone structure in the Plains Vernacular style. The corners are marked with quoins, and the school is covered by a hipped roof. After brief service as a church the school became the a museum in 1965, and now serves as the centerpiece of the Albany Museum complex. Other buildings include a railroad museum, windmill, caboose, antique automobiles, tractors and a 1950s period farmhouse. s

The school was placed on the National Register of Historic Places on April 13, 1972.

References

External links
City of Sabetha website on Albany and the museum
 Albany Museum - information from the Nemaha County Historical Society
 Kansas Travel: Albany Historical Museum - review and photos

School buildings completed in 1866
Buildings and structures in Nemaha County, Kansas
School buildings on the National Register of Historic Places in Kansas
Historic American Buildings Survey in Kansas
1866 establishments in Kansas
Museums in Nemaha County, Kansas
National Register of Historic Places in Nemaha County, Kansas
Vernacular architecture in the United States